Noblella ritarasquinae is a species of frog in the family Strabomantidae. It is endemic to Bolivia and known only from near its type locality in the San Matéo River valley, Chapare Province. The range is within the Carrasco National Park. Its natural habitat is tropical moist montane forest. It is a terrestrial, leaf-litter species.

References

ritarasquinae
Amphibians of Bolivia
Endemic fauna of Bolivia
Taxonomy articles created by Polbot
Amphibians described in 2000